Streptocarpus ulugurensis is a species of flowering plant in the family Gesneriaceae, native to Tanzania. It was first described in 2009 as Saintpaulia ulugurensis. The former genus Saintpaulia was reduced to Streptocarpus sect. Saintpaulia in 2015, and the species moved to Streptocarpus.

References	

ulugurensis
Endemic flora of Tanzania
Plants described in 2009